The 2008 NCAA Division III women's basketball tournament was the 27th annual tournament hosted by the NCAA to determine the national champion of Division III women's collegiate basketball in the United States. Howard Payne defeated Messiah in the championship game, 68–54, to claim the Yellow Jackets' first Division III national title. The championship rounds were hosted by Hope College at the DeVos Fieldhouse in Holland, Michigan.

Bracket

Final Four

All-tournament team
 Meia Daniels, Howard Payne
 Kim Hoffman, Howard Payne
 Nikki Lobach, Messiah
 Tina Grace, Oglethorpe
 Tiffany Morton, Wisconsin–Whitewater

See also
 2008 NCAA Division I women's basketball tournament
 2008 NCAA Division II women's basketball tournament
 2008 NAIA Division I women's basketball tournament
 2008 NAIA Division II women's basketball tournament
 2008 NCAA Division III men's basketball tournament

References

 
NCAA Division III women's basketball tournament
2008 in sports in Michigan
Howard Payne Yellow Jackets
Messiah Falcons